Mikita Nyakrasaw (born 13 October 2000) is a Belarusian professional footballer who plays for BATE Borisov.

Honours
Gomel
Belarusian Cup winner: 2021–22

References

External links 
 
 

2000 births
Living people
People from Rechytsa
Sportspeople from Gomel Region
Belarusian footballers
Association football forwards
FC Torpedo Minsk players
FC Sputnik Rechitsa players
FC Gomel players
FC BATE Borisov players